Presidential elections were held in Panama on 15 June 1945. The Constitutional Assembly elected Enrique Adolfo Jiménez as provisional President of the Republic.

Results

References

Panama
1945 in Panama
Presidential elections in Panama
June 1945 events in North America